Ramnagar is a city, just outside of Varanasi city and a municipal board in Varanasi district in the Indian state of Uttar Pradesh. Ramnagar has a fort known as Ramnagar Fort which is still the residence of King of Varanasi (Benares). He was known as Kashi Naresh meaning king of Kashi (Ancient name of Beneres) and is still regarded by old residents of the city of Varanasi. Ramnagar Fort and its museum are the repository of the history of the kings of Benares and since the 18th century has been the home of Kashi Naresh. Even today the Kashi Naresh is deeply revered by the people of Benares. He is the religious head and the people of Benares consider him the incarnation of Shiva. He is also the chief cultural patron and an essential part of all religious celebrations. Ramnagar is popular for Ramlila that is held annually under the aegis of King of Varanasi

Recently Ramnagar has emerged as a favourite spot for shooting movies because of the scenic location of the Ramnagar Fort (residence of the King of Varanasi) near the Ganges. Chokher Bali, Raanjhanaa are one of the popular movies shot here. Amazon Prime web series Mirzapur and Anurag Kashyap Gangs of Wasseypur was also shot in Ramnagar. The town has many century-old houses and structures near the fort area.

History

The Ramnagar Fort was built by Kashi Naresh Raja Balwant Singh with creamy chunar sandstone in the eighteenth century. It is a typically Mughal style of architecture with carved balconies, open courtyards, and picturesque pavilions.

Ramlila
Over a million pilgrims arrive annually for the vast processions and performances of Ramlila organized by Kashi Naresh. The Ramlila of Ramnagar basically operated by Maharaja of Banaras with the help of Pt. Laxmi Narayan Pandey and his cultural family every year. It is one of the majestic show which happens once in the year every time. The venues are well scattered across Ramnagar, Lanka, Janakpuri, PAC and several small areas.

Demographics
As of the 2001 Census of India, Ramnagar had a population of 39,941. Males constitute 54% of the population and females 46%. Ramnagar has an average literacy rate of 58%, lower than the national average of 59.5%: male literacy is 66%, and female literacy is 49%. In Ramnagar, 15% of the population is under 6 years of age.

References

External links
 Images of the famous Ramnagar Ramlila
 Ramnagar Fort

Census towns in Varanasi district
Cities and towns in Varanasi district
Tourism in Uttar Pradesh